Meca astralis is a species of snout moth, and the only species in the genus Meca. Both the species and genus were described by Ferdinand Karsch in 1900. It is known from southern Cameroon.

References

Moths described in 1900
Pyralinae